Henry Grey, 8th Earl of Kent (c. 1583 – 21 November 1639) of Wrest Park, Bedfordshire was Earl of Kent from 1623 to his death.

He was born the only son of Charles Grey, 7th Earl of Kent and his wife Susan Cotton and educated at Trinity College, Cambridge. His legal agents include John Selden, a prominent jurist.

On 16 November 1601, at St Martin-in-the-Fields, Henry married Elizabeth Talbot (1582 – 7 December 1651), a daughter of Gilbert Talbot, 7th Earl of Shrewsbury and Mary Cavendish. There were no known children from this marriage. He was knighted in 1603.

He was elected member of parliament for Tavistock in 1601 and knight of the shire for Bedfordshire in 1614.

He served as Lord Lieutenant of Bedfordshire from 1621 to 1627 and again from 1629 to his death. From 1621 to 1623, Henry held the title jointly with his father Charles Grey, 7th Earl of Kent. From 1625 to 1627 and again from 1629 to his death, he held the title jointly with Thomas Wentworth, 1st Earl of Cleveland.

He died childless and his primary title as Earl of Kent was inherited by his closest male-line relative, Anthony Grey, 9th Earl of Kent, the Rector of Burbage, Leicestershire. Anthony was a second cousin of his father as they were both great-grandsons of George Grey, 2nd Earl of Kent. His title of Baron Grey de Ruthyn was awarded by the House of Lords to his nephew Charles Longueville, 12th Baron Grey de Ruthyn, son of his sister Susan.

Sources
The Complete Peerage
History of Parliament GREY, Henry (c.1583-1639) of Flitton, Beds

External links
A Grey family pedigree

1580s births
1639 deaths
Alumni of Trinity College, Cambridge
Earls of Kent (1465 creation)
Lord-Lieutenants of Bedfordshire
Henry
16th-century English nobility
17th-century English nobility
English MPs 1601
English MPs 1614
Barons Grey of Ruthin